Paul Bloodgood (1960 – May 4, 2018) was an artist and gallery owner who played an iconoclastic role in the New York art world for multiple decades.  Bloodgood produced predominantly abstract paintings often relating to the works of earlier artists from Jackson Pollock to Paul Cézanne. He co-founded the AC Project Room in Lower Manhattan, and held solo exhibitions in several US cities, including New York, San Francisco, and Washington D.C., and at the Andreas Binder Gallery in Germany. His group exhibitions included shows at the Saatchi Gallery in London. He was a 2009 Guggenheim Fellow.

Life
Paul Bloodgood was born in Nyack, New York, and awarded a BA in painting from Yale University in 1982. He moved to New York City in 1986 and received his MFA from Maine College of Art in 2002. He taught painting at Rutgers University, Cooper Union, and the Savannah College of Art, and was a recipient of multiple awards, including the John Simon Guggenheim Memorial Foundation Fellowship in 2009.

Michael Kimmelman wrote in The New York Times, "Mr. Bloodgood pushes things right to the edge, but not over it. The gestures are dizzying, yet not empty or simply derivative of the Abstract Expressionists whose art he inevitably evokes. There's a genuine and exuberant emotional quality here that suggests Mr. Bloodgood is someone to watch."

A 2012 Art in America review of his second solo show at the Newman Popiashvili Gallery described Objects in Pieces (2011) as having "a sense of being in the thick of things, a zooming in, as opposed to a deliberate fracturing and arranging. The accentuated density of elements and the intensity of this particular painting make it his most accessible and instantly gratifying canvas to date." It explained that Bloodgood had recently suffered a head injury, the result of a 2010 mugging, "leaving him with an optical disorder that prevents him from recognizing a whole object if he sees only parts of it... the artist has since changed his process and is relying on his impairment, rather than collages, to create his fragmentary abstractions."

"Standing in front of Bloodgood’s oils," it continued, "one is deeply impressed by the artist’s offbeat perspective and resolute pursuit of his own language."

From 1989 to 2001, Bloodgood operated AC Project Room, an independent, artist-run commercial gallery, initially on Renwick Avenue, later moving to Broome Street in SoHo, New York, along with Alissa Friedman and fellow artist Anne Chu. Together, they organized early, solo exhibits of many important artists' works, including: Louise Lawler, Matthew Ritchie, Isa Genzken, Fiona Banner, Kai Althoff, Verne Dawson, Doug Aitken, Kiki Smith, Jane & Louise Wilson, and Josiah McElheny.

For four years in the early 2000s he worked as a colorist, creating a range of paint colours for Martha Stewart and Lowe's Home Centers based on Paul Klee's color theories from his time at the Bauhaus.

Despite being diagnosed with early onset Alzhiemer's disease following the traumatic 2010 brain injury, Bloodgood continued working in his studio until 2017.

Exhibitions

Solo exhibitions

2018
Paul Bloodgood, White Columns, New York, NY

2016
Paul Bloodgood, The Art Complex Museum, Duxbury, MA

2013 
An Inch of Wholeness, Pei Ling Chan Gallery, Savannah, GA

2012 
Objects in Pieces, Newman-Popiashvilli Gallery, New York;
Paul Bloodgood, Susanna Hilberry Gallery, Detroit, MI

2010 
Thing Language, Newman Popiashvili Gallery, New York, NY

1999 
AC Project Room, New York, NY

1996 
Rena Bransten Gallery, San Francisco, CA;
Andreas Binder Gallery, Munich, Germany;
Jack’s Name Painting, 303 Gallery, NY.

1995 
Sandra Gering Gallery, NY;
An Epic Poem on the History of Industrialization by R. Buckminster Fuller, Gavin Brown's Enterprise, NY;
Baumgartner Gallery, Washington D.C.

1994 
Baumgartner Gallery, Washington D.C.

1993 
Paintings and House Poems, Sandra Gering Gallery, NY

1992 
Margulies Taplin Gallery, Boca Raton, FL

1990 
House Poems from Mab Library, Daniel Newburg Gallery Project Room, NY; 
Travels from the Notebook, AC Project Room, NY

Group exhibitions

2014 
Abstract America Today, Saatchi Gallery, London

2013 
Almanac, Newman Popiashvili Gallery, New York

2012 
A painting show (in two parts) curated by Michelle Grabner, peregrineprogram, Chicago, IL;
Loughelton Revisited, Winkleman Gallery, New York;
Paint, Saatchi Gallery, London

2009 
Paul Bloodgood, Anne Chu, Walter Keller Gallery, Zurich, Switzerland;
At Close Range, Edward Thorp Gallery, New York

2008 
Peace Among Topographers, Michel Auder and Paul Bloogood, Newman Popishvili Gallery, New York, NY and Susanne Hilberry Gallery, Ferndale, MI;
Unrelated, curated by Matthew Higgs, Wilkinson Gallery, London
Paul Bloodgood, Leonard Bullock, Greg Kwiatek, David Zwirner Gallery, NY 

2007 
Looking Back: The White Columns Annual, selected by Clarissa Dalrymple, White Columns, New York;
Things From Your Life: An Exhibition in 3 Homes, curated by Kelly Adams and Paul Bloodgood, Jackson Heights, New York;
In The Viewing Room, curated by Lisa Sigal, Frederieke Taylor Gallery, NY 
Jackson, curated by Barry Rosenberg, University of Connecticut Art Galleries, Stoors, CT

2000 
Collaboration with Matthew Higgs, Matthew Higgs, Murray Guy, New York

1998 
In The Beginning, Murray Guy, New York New Digs, AC Project Room, New York

1997 
Paul Bloodgood/Marybeth Edelson, Art Resources Transfer, New York, NY;
Shadows curated by Suzanne Joelson, E.S. Vandam;
Paul Bloodgood, Paula Hayes, Josiah McElheny, Sandra Vallejos, AC Project Room, New York

1996 
25th Anniversary, John Weber Gallery, New York; 
Drawings from the Mab Library, AC Project Room, New York

1995 
Raw, Postmasters Gallery, New York;
Material Abuse, Trans Hudson Gallery, Jersey City, NJ. Curated by Mark Harris

1994 
Reveillon ‘94, Stux Gallery, New York; 
Sandra Gering Gallery, New York Shouts and Whispers, Venue, Philadelphia, PA

1993 
Anxious Art, Bernard Toale Gallery, Boston, MA; 
Jours Tranquille à Clichy, Paolo Croyannes, Paris, France. Curated by Alain Kirili

1992 
Bloodgood, Bullock, Cohen & Kinmont, Sandra Gering Gallery, New York.

In 1995 he worked on the Epilepsy Foundation's "Winning Kids" program, helping children with epilepsy create art.

Further reading
2012:
Wilson, Michael. “Paul Bloodgood, ‘Objects in Pieces.' Time Out New York (February 2–8, 2012): 40;
McClemont, Doug. “Reviews: Paul Bloodgood.” Artnews (June 2012): 96

2009:
Coggins, David. “Paul Bloodgood and Michel Auder.” Art in America (February, 2009): 130-131;
Dobrzynski, Judith H. “What Does it take to Win a Guggenheim Fellowship, Part 2.” Real Clear Arts. (April 23, 2009) [online]

2008:
Perry, Colin. “Unrelated.” Frieze Magazine (July, 2008);
“Bloodgood, Bullock, Kwiatec.” Art News (2008);
Hayden-Guest, Anthony. saatchionline.com (2008) [online]

2000:
Myles, Eileen. Art in America (March, 2000)

1999:
MacAdam, Barbara. Art News (October, 1999);
Conley, Kevin. The New Yorker (May 10, 1999);
Schmerler, Sarah. “Paul Bloodgood: Now Wait for Last Year.” Time Out New York (May 6, 1999);
Glueck, Grace. “Art in Review,” The New York Times (April 23, 1999)

1998:
Cotter, Holland. “When Words’ Meaning is in Their Look. The New York Times (October 16, 1998);
Kino, Carol. “In the Beginning.” Time Out New york, Issue 159 (October 8–15, 1998): 62;
Scott, Andrea. “Current Top Picks.” City Search (October 8, 1998)

1996:
Melrod, George. “Openings.” Art & Antiques (June 25, 1996):
Halle, Howard. Time Out New York (May, 1996)

1995:
Siegel, Jeanne. “Reviews.” Art International (May/July, 1995): 237;
Schjeldahl, Peter. “Gallery Legs.” The Village Voice (May 30, 1995);
Smith, Roberta. “Art in Review.” The New York Times (May 14, 1993): C26
Scott, Sue. ARTnews (September, 1993): 176

1993:
Saltz, Jerry. “Critic’s Diary.” Art in America (June, 1993): 43;
Kimmelman, Michael. The New York Times (May 14, 1993): C26;
Scott, Sue. ARTnews (September, 1993): 175

References

1960 births
2018 deaths
Artists from New York (state)
Yale University alumni
20th-century American painters
American male painters
21st-century American painters
21st-century American male artists
20th-century American male artists
People from Rockland County, New York